Agnieszka Radwańska was the defending champion, but lost in the quarterfinals to Virginie Razzano.

Caroline Wozniacki won the title, defeating Razzano in the final 7–6(7–5), 7–5.

Seeds

Draw

Finals

Top half

Bottom half

External links
Main Singles draw
Qualifying draw

Aegon International
Singles